Mike Hawthorne is an American comic book artist known for his work on books such as Deadpool, G.I. JOE: Origins, Queen & Country, Conan: Road of Kings, and his own creator-owned book, Hysteria.

Career
Hawthorne is the creator of the comic book series Hysteria and has provided the artwork for various other comics, including Deadpool, The Un-men, Fear Agent, Umbra, G.I. JOE: Origins, Whiskey Dickel, Three Days in Europe, one story arc of Queen & Country, and Conan: Road of Kings.

He also writes and draws a webcomic titled Raising Crazy about his experiences raising his son.

Personal life
Hawthorne is from York, Pennsylvania and is a 1993 graduate of William Penn Senior High School.  It was there that he met his wife Despina, with whom he has three children.  Hawthorne earned a scholarship for a summer program by the Governor's School for the Arts, and graduated in 1998 from Tyler School of Art at Temple University.

Bibliography
 Three Days In Europe (with Antony Johnston, 4-issue mini-series, Oni Press, 2002–2003, tpb, 152 pages, 2003)
 G.I. JOE: Origins Vol. 1 (with Larry Hama, 4-issue mini-series, IDW Publishing, tpb, 128 pages, 2009)
 Queen & Country: The Definitive Edition, Vol. 2 (with Greg Rucka, Oni Press, tpb, 376 pages, 2008)
 Conan Volume 11: Road of Kings (with Roy Thomas, 12-issue mini-series, Dark Horse, tpb, 152 pages, 2011)

References

Inline citations

General references
 
 "Unearthing Un-Men: Mike Hawthorne on His Vertigo Series". Newsarama, November 8, 2006
 "Talking About The Un-Men With Mike Hawthorne". Newsarama, September 14, 2007
 Arrant, Chris (January 5, 2011). "TArtist Mike Hawthorne Hits The Road With Conan". Newsarama.
 Arrant, Chris (January 31, 2012). "Conan Artist Debuts New Graphic Novel... in French!" Newsarama.

External links

 Hawthorne's blog
 The Mike Hawthorne Sketchbook
 Mike Hawthorne On Putting It All Online, Newsarama, October 5, 2007
 Mike Hawthorne's webcomic, "Raising Crazy" Oct.23, 2011

American comics artists
Living people
American webcomic creators
People from York, Pennsylvania
Year of birth missing (living people)
Marvel Comics people
DC Comics people